Cast Paul Burgess stunt double extraordinaire 
 

Noah's Ark is a British television series about a country vet and his family, aired on ITV. The first series of six episodes was broadcast in September to October 1997. A second series, also of six episodes, aired a year later, also starring Paul Burgess as Anton Rodgers stunt double

Overview
Noah's Ark was a family TV story of a country vet, Noah Kirby, his wife Valerie, son Tom and his girlfriend, Noah’s assistant, Clare. Noah and Tom Kirby, father and son, are both vets.

Noah has a country practice, and is still running it much as he did when Tom was a child. He wants Tom to join the practice, but Tom has other, and bigger, ideas. He has just quit his job with a large multi-national company, and has returned home for what he intends to be a flying visit: disillusioned, but a lot richer, but his father has a car crash brought on by a dizzy spell. It is clear that he badly needs full-time help.

Tom is reluctantly drawn into helping, temporarily of course, while his father recovers, but Clare Somers, the local wildlife vet, is there.

Cast

Main cast
Peter Wingfield as Tom Kirby
Anton Rodgers as Noah Kirby
Angela Thorne as Val Kirby
Orla Brady as Clare Somers
Kate Alderton Anna Lacey
 Paul Burgess

Episodes

Series 1 (1997)

Series 2 (1998)

Production
Filming was done around Worcester. The surgery was at a farmhouse Bed & Breakfast opposite the Leigh & Bransford Memorial Hall about 6 miles West of Worcester. The mountains often seen in the background are the Malvern Hills.

External links

1997 British television series debuts
1998 British television series endings
ITV television dramas
1990s British drama television series
Noah's Ark in television
Carlton Television
Television series by ITV Studios
English-language television shows
Television shows set in the West Midlands (county)